Rose George is a British journalist and author. She began writing in 1994, as an intern at The Nation magazine in New York City. Later, she became senior editor and writer at COLORS magazine, the bilingual "global magazine about local cultures" published in eighty countries and based first in Rome, then Paris, then Venice. In 1999, she moved to London and began a freelance career and has since written for the Independent on Sunday, Arena, the Financial Times, Daily Telegraph, Details, Bad Idea and others. Along the way, she has been war correspondent in Kosovo for Condé Nast Traveler magazine and was twice a guest at Saddam Hussein's birthday party. Until 2010, she was senior editor at large for Tank, a quarterly magazine of fashion, art, reportage, and culture based in London.

She has written four non-fiction books. A Life Removed (Penguin 2004), explores the daily reality of refugees and displaced people in and from Liberia.The Big Necessity: the Unmentionable World of Human Waste and Why it Matters (Metropolitan/Portobello 2008).

Her third book, Ninety Percent of Everything: Inside Shipping, the Invisible Industry That Puts Clothes on Your Back, Gas in Your Car, and Food on Your Plate, was released in August 2013. The UK title of this book is Deep Sea and Foreign Going: Inside Shipping, the Invisible Industry the Brings you 90% of Everything, also released August 2013.

Her fourth book is Nine Pints: A Journey Through the Money, Medicine, and Mysteries of Blood (Metropolitan Books, 2018).

George graduated with a First-Class Honours BA in Modern Languages at Somerville College, Oxford in 1992 and an MA in international politics in 1994 from the University of Pennsylvania as a Thouron Scholar and Fulbright Fellow. She speaks fluent French and Italian.

Books
 A Life Removed (Penguin Books, 2004) 
 The Big Necessity (Metropolitan/Portobello, 2008) 
 Ninety Percent of Everything (Metropolitan Books New York, 2013)  
 Deep Sea and Foreign Going  (Portobello London 2013) 
 Nine Pints: a Journey Through the Money, Medicine, and Mysteries of Blood'' (Metropolitan Books, 2018)

References

 Rose, George. THE BIG NECESSITY. 1st edition. New York, New York: Metropolitan Books, 2008. Print.
 http://www.who.int/water_sanitation_health/publications/facts2004/en/
 George, Rose. "...And Sewage, Too." NY Times. N.p., 27 2010. Web. 9 November 2012. https://www.nytimes.com/2010/04/28/opinion/28george.html

External links
 
 

British expatriates in the United States
British journalists
Living people
Year of birth missing (living people)
Alumni of Somerville College, Oxford
Writers from Leeds